Cardiff School of Engineering is part of Cardiff University’s College of Physical Sciences.

Cardiff School of Engineering has approximately 1,600 undergraduate and postgraduate students and employs around 300 academic, research, technical and administrative staff. The School offers taught undergraduate and postgraduate degrees (BEng, MEng, and MSc) and postgraduate research degrees (PhD) in a range of engineering subjects, as well as being involved in a number of community, commercial and industrial partnerships.

The school hosts academic conferences and is involved in large scale research and engineering projects, particularly in the field of renewable energy such as wind turbines power grid efficiency and tidal power generation. Other topics under research include traditional engineering studies such as metal fatigue and waste disposal engineering as well as new fields of study such as carbon management in energy production.

The school of engineering is organised into three departments with associated research groups. 

 Architectural, Civil and Environmental Engineering
 Electrical and Electronic Engineering
 Mechanical and Medical Engineering

Institutes
Research at the School of Engineering is organised into seven research institutes:

Institute of Energy
Institute of Environment and Sustainability
BRE Institute of Sustainable Engineering
Institute of Mechanics and Advanced Materials
Institute of Mechanical and Manufacturing Engineering
Institute of Medical Engineering and Medical Physics
Institute of Green Electronic Systems

References 

"Secrets of bee honeycombs revealed". Phys.org
Nobel Prize Winners Cardiff University | Knowledge & Beyond

External links 

Cardiff University
Engineering universities and colleges in the United Kingdom